Carmex is a brand of lip balm produced by Carma Laboratories, Inc. It is sold in jars, sticks, and squeezable containers.

History
Carma Laboratories, Inc. began in Wisconsin in the early 1930s, when Alfred Woelbing began experimenting with creating his own line of lip balm and other cosmetic products. After experimenting with his products, Woelbing created Carmex on his family's stove top. He began by selling the product from the trunk of his car. Popularity increased through word-of-mouth. During this time Woelbing and his wife poured their lip balm into the now well-known yellow-capped jars. Then in 1957, the family business moved out of the kitchen and into a rented facility in the Milwaukee suburb of Wauwatosa.

After doing business like this, Woelbing discontinued making sales calls in 1972, which had mostly been in Wisconsin, Illinois and parts of Indiana. Woelbing's son Don joined the business in 1973, and introduced assembly lines to Carma Labs. In 1975, due to the product's success, a new production facility was built in the southwest suburb of Franklin; production at the same facility continues to the present day. The company employs about 100 people. It remains under the ownership of the founding family.

Carma Labs began producing the product in squeezable tubes in 1988. In 1989, it began producing it in stick form which had been the longtime form factor for ChapStick and Blistex, Carma's major competitors in the lip balm market. After these expansions within the company's production, in 1993, it was estimated that 9% of the lip balm market was held by Carma Labs. Alfred Woelbing continued to drive to the offices every day until 1997, when he suffered a stroke. He continued to come into the office at least once a week after this, until he died in 2001 at age 100.

The company continued further expansion under the management of Alfred's son Don and grandsons Paul and Eric. In 2002, mint-flavored Carmex lip balm (SPF 30) joined original Carmex lip balm in the product line, and Carmex lip balm became available throughout North America, Australia, Europe, Asia and Africa. During 2006, Internet voters chose strawberry and cherry as the newest Carmex lip balm sticks and also introduced the DailyCare Carmex with SPF 15. In 2017, the Carmex Comfort Care Lip Balm won the 2017 "Product of the Year" award in the Lip Care category.

Ingredients
In the United States, the active ingredients of Carmex lip balm are benzocaine, camphor (1.7%), menthol (0.7%), phenol (0.4%), and salicylic acid. The inactive ingredients, in order of greatest used to least used in the product, are petrolatum, lanolin, cetyl esters, paraffin wax, cocoa butter, beeswax, and flavor. However, this formula varies slightly around the world. The use of phenol in cosmetics is prohibited in the European Union.

Salicylic acid is a non-steroidal anti-inflammatory drug (NSAID) almost identical to aspirin. In fact, aspirin's mechanism of action as an NSAID results from it being metabolized into salicylic acid. It is often incorrectly thought to be a drying agent; however, this is not true. Salicylic acid works as a keratolytic, comedolytic, and bacteriostatic agent, causing the cells of the epidermis to shed more readily, opening clogged pores and neutralizing bacteria within, preventing pores from clogging up again by constricting pore diameter, and allowing room for new cell growth.

References

External links
 

Companies based in Wisconsin
Lips
Cosmetics brands